Richard P. Von Herzen (1930–2016) was an Earth scientist at Woods Hole Oceanographic Institution who pioneered studies of heat flowing from the seafloor. He won the 1998 Maurice Ewing Medal.  He graduated from California Institute of Technology (BA), Harvard University (MA), and the Scripps Institution of Oceanography (PhD).

References 

2016 deaths
1930 births
American earth scientists
Woods Hole Oceanographic Institution
California Institute of Technology alumni
Harvard University alumni
Scripps Institution of Oceanography alumni